was a radical Buddhist preacher of Nichirenism who founded the interwar Japanese far-right militant organization . Contrary to popular belief, he was never an ordained Nichiren priest, but was rather a self-styled preacher whose extremist tenets were widely denounced by Japan's mainline Nichiren Buddhist establishment of the time.

Biography 
Inoue was born Inoue Shirō (later adopting the name Akira and then Nisshō, lit. “Called by the Sun”) in Kawaba, Gunma Prefecture, in 1887, the son of a rural doctor. Educated at Toyo Cooperative (present-day Takushoku University), he abandoned his studies and traveled to Manchuria where he spent time as a vagabond and ultimately found employment from 1909 to 1920 with the South Manchuria Railway. Upon his return to Japan, he first studied to become a Zen priest but then became a follower of Nichiren Buddhism, a conversion that led him to relocate to Miho, Shizuoka Prefecture, in order to study under the Nichiren scholar and nationalist preacher Tanaka Chigaku at his Kokuchukai Academy. Inoue met Aikido founder Morihei Ueshiba during this time period. Inoue soon became disillusioned with Tanaka's teachings, however, and in 1928 he relocated to Ōarai, Ibaraki, where he established his own temple, which also served as a youth training center, advocating a militarist revolution in Japan. During this time, with the assistance of former Lord Keeper of the Privy Seal of Japan Mitsuaki Tanaka, he became acquainted with such right wing figures as Shūmei Ōkawa and Ikki Kita, and received enthusiastic support from the radicalized young officers of the nearby Tsuchiura Naval Base.

In 1930, Inoue moved to Tokyo where he set about forming Ketsumeidan, recruiting members amongst university student radicals. Ketsumeidan was officially founded in 1932 together with a group of 13 young officers including Shō Onuma and Goro Hishinuma, establishing as its goal the overthrow of the political and economic elite of the time, with the motto “One Man, One Assassination.” The group's first wave of assassinations came in early 1932, when former finance minister Junnosuke Inoue was shot on February 9, as was the Director General of the Mitsui zaibatsu Baron Dan Takuma on March 5, collectively known as the League of Blood Incident. Inoue was arrested soon after the latter assassination, after which Koga Kiyoshi, a trusted subordinate, took over the reins of the group and set about organizing a second wave, which culminated in the May 15 assassination of Prime Minister Inukai Tsuyoshi, an event known as the "May 15 Incident".

In the trial the Rinzai abbot Gempo Yamamoto testified in favor of his former disciple, justifying his violence from a Zen and imperialist point of view.
Inoue and the three Ketsumeidan gunmen were sentenced to life imprisonment in November 1934, with the rest of the arrested group members given lighter sentences. Inoue was later granted amnesty and released from prison in 1940. Identified as a fascist by the US occupational forces, he was purged from public life in 1947. He was rehabilitated upon the end of the occupation of Japan and remained a prominent figure in right-wing activist circles in post-occupation Japan era until his death by stroke in 1967.

See also 
 Japanese nationalism
 Shōwa Restoration
 Criticism of Buddhism#Nationalism
 Buddhism and violence

References 

 堀まきよう　（Makiyo Hori）,「井上日召と"かぎの折伏"：血盟団事件について」（"Inoue Nissho and his Terrorist Ideas: Some Notes on the Oath of Blood Group"）早稲田政治経済学雑誌（The Waseda Journal of Political Science and Economics）328 (1996).
 小林秀雄 (Hideo Kobayashi), 「井上日召の思想と行動：日本ファシストの一類型」(“The Thoughts and Activities of Inoue Nissho: A Model for Japanese Fascists) 歴史評論 (Rekishi Hyoron) 400 (1983).
 Stephen S. Large, “Nationalist Extremism in Early Showa Japan: Inoue Nissho and the ‘Blood-Pledge Corps Incident’, 1932" in Modern Asian Studies 35:3 (2001).
 父が子に送る一億人の昭和史：人物現代史 (One Hundred Million People's Showa History from Father to Child – Modern Biographical Histories), Mainichi Shimbun Press, 1977.

1887 births
1967 deaths
Japanese activists
Far-right politics in Japan
Japanese Buddhist clergy
Nichiren Buddhism
Nichiren Buddhists
Nichiren-shū Buddhist monks
People from Gunma Prefecture
Takushoku University alumni
20th-century Buddhist monks